Sacroiliac ligament can refer to:
 Anterior sacroiliac ligament (ligamentum sacroiliacum anterius)
 Interosseous sacroiliac ligament (ligamentum sacroiliacum interosseum)
 Posterior sacroiliac ligament (ligamentum sacroiliacum posterius)